The 1996 French Figure Skating Championships took place in January 1996 in Albertville for singles and pairs and in Lyon for ice dance. Skaters competed in the disciplines of men's singles, women's singles, pair skating, and ice dancing on the senior level. The event was used to help determine the French team to the 1996 World Championships and the 1996 European Championships.

Results

Men

Ladies

Pairs

Ice dance

External links
 French article

1995 in figure skating
French Figure Skating Championships, 1996
French Figure Skating Championships
Sport in Albertville
1996 in French sport